Christine Berthe Claude Denis de Rivoyre (29 November 1921 – 3 January 2019) was a French journalist and writer.

Biography 
The daughter of  Francois Denis de Rivoyre and Madeleine Ballande, she was born in Tarbes. She was educated in Catholic schools and then received a degree in literature from the Sorbonne. She continued her studies at the Syracuse University. De Rivoyre wrote articles for Le Monde and then became literary editor for Marie Claire.

Her first novel L'Alouette au miroir, published in 1955, received the Prix des Quatre Jurys. Several of her novels have been made into films:
 La Mandarine (1957); 1971 film
 Les Sultans (1964); 1968 film
 Le Petit matin (1968); 1971 film - novel received the Prix Interallié

De Rivoyre received the Prix Prince Pierre de Monaco in 1979 and the Grand Prix de Littérature Paul Morand in 1984 from the Académie française for her work.

She was named an Officier in the French Legion of Honour.

References 

1921 births
2019 deaths
People from Tarbes
French women journalists
French women novelists
Prix Interallié winners
Officiers of the Légion d'honneur
20th-century French novelists
20th-century French journalists
20th-century French women writers
University of Paris alumni
Syracuse University alumni
Le Monde writers